Raymond John Flynn (March 7, 1914 – January 1, 1996), known professionally as John Rodney, was an American actor, who worked in film and television. He also used the name John Flynn.

Career

Theatrical films 
He was born in Brooklyn, New York in March 1914 and his career spanned from the late 1940s until the early 1960s, with significant movie roles and numerous television appearances. He is probably best known to audiences as Deputy Sheriff Sawyer in John Huston's crime film Key Largo (1948) starring Humphrey Bogart, Edward G. Robinson and Lauren Bacall. He also appeared in the films Pursued (1947) starring Theresa Wright and Robert Mitchum, Fighter Squadron (1948) starring Edmond O'Brien and Robert Stack, and Calamity Jane and Sam Bass (1949) starring Yvonne De Carlo and Howard Duff.

Television 
Rodney appeared on many television programs in the late 1940s, '50s and '60s including a Westinghouse Studio One episode titled The Storm, Bonanza as the actor Edwin Booth, Sea Hunt (1961) starring Lloyd Bridges, season 4's episodes 29 & 37 of Wagon Train, The Fugitive starring David Janssen and Gunsmoke. He guest starred on an episode of McHale's Navy starring Ernest Borgnine. He last appeared in The Tycoon starring Walter Brennan in 1964.

Filmography

References

External links
 
 

1914 births
1996 deaths
20th-century American male actors
American male film actors
American male television actors
People from Brooklyn